Battle Ground Academy (BGA) is an independent college-preparatory school for grades K-12. BGA is located in Franklin, Tennessee, US.  Founded in 1889, the school was originally located in part on the site of the Battle of Franklin in the American Civil War.  BGA has two campuses. The Harpeth Campus is located on Franklin Road in the historic Cox House and is home to Grades K-4.  The Glen Echo campus is centered on historic plantation house Glen Echo and is located off Mack Hatcher Parkway and is home to grades 5 to 12.

History

Battle Ground Academy was established in 1889, and it was named for its original location during the Civil War Battle of Franklin.

The first campus was erected at the corner of Columbia Avenue and Cleburne Street. S. V. Wall and W. D. Mooney were chosen as the first to lead the new academy. In 1902, the original school building burned at which time the school was relocated to Columbia Avenue in Franklin.

BGA was established to educate boys originally and girls began to attend some time later. The school operated as a day school though students came from outside the local area to attend. They boarded in private homes until the first dormitory was built in 1922. At this time, BGA evolved to become a boarding and day school.

After the construction of the first dormitory, the decision was made to change to an all-male student body. The departure of the last girl students in 1929 ushered in a half-century when BGA was a boys' school.

In the early 1970s, the boarding program was phased out. BGA once again welcomed girls to its student body.  At present, the female enrollment accounts for approximately 50 percent of the student body.

In 1996, the location of the Battle Ground Academy Upper School changed to the current site on Ernest Rice Lane (off of  Mack Hatcher Parkway). In 2003, the Middle School joined the Upper School on the Glen Echo campus. Additionally, in 1998, Battle Ground Academy acquired the former Harpeth Academy. This became the BGA Lower School on Franklin Road. Currently, the school operates with two physical campuses and has three divisions: Lower School, Middle School, and Upper School.

Student Honors
The BGA Artist Guild was established in 1987. As the Guild grew in size and prestige, the group began to have public performances. Guild Night has become a tradition for parents and students each year.. Board of Trust Merit Scholarships are provided to some of BGA's most promising incoming freshmen. This scholarship program was established in 2005 to recognize outstanding academic performance.
 Digamma is an in-school honor society. Members are BGA students who are sophomores, juniors or seniors having a cumulative academic GPA of 3.1.

Notable alumni
C. J. Beathard '12, Jacksonville Jaguars quarterback
Tucker Beathard '14, country music singer
Paul Woodrow "Woody Paul" Chrisman '67, fiddle player and nuclear physicist, MIT Ph.D. Nuclear Physics, member of Riders in the Sky
Earnest H. “Josh” Cody 1911, college athlete, head coach and athletics director
W. Wirt Courtney 1907, U.S. Representative from Tennessee
Troy Fleming '99, National Football League fullback
McGavock Dickinson "Mac" Gayden '58, song writer and singer
Bob Harris '44, National Basketball Association basketball player
Orrin H. Ingram II '78, businessman
Douglas S. Jackson '72, former Tennessee State Senator and attorney
Joe Jenkins, Major League Baseball catcher for the St. Louis Browns and Chicago White Sox
Mike Keith '86, radio announcer for the Tennessee Titans
Wendell Mayes, screenwriter
John P. Newsome, U.S. Representative from Alabama
George Plaster '78, Nashville sports radio personality
Natalie Stovall '00, country music artist

Notes

External links 
BGA website

1889 establishments in Tennessee
Buildings and structures in Franklin, Tennessee
Preparatory schools in Tennessee
Private K-12 schools in Tennessee
Schools in Williamson County, Tennessee